Antiochtha pycnotarsa is a moth in the family Lecithoceridae. It was described by Kyu-Tek Park and Chun-Sheng Wu in 2001. It is found in Sri Lanka.

The wingspan is about 16 mm. The forewings are dark brown, with golden yellow scales along the veins. The costa is golden yellow. The fringe is black with a creamy white basal line around the apex and on the termen.

Etymology
The species name refers to the thickened tarsus and is derived from pycno (meaning thick).

References

Moths described in 2001
Antiochtha